Shackleton Icefalls is extensive icefalls of the upper Beardmore Glacier, southward of Mount Darwin and Mount Mills. Named by the British Antarctic Expedition (1910–13) for Sir Ernest Shackleton, leader of the British Antarctic Expedition (1907–09), who first penetrated this region.

References
 

Icefalls of the Ross Dependency
Dufek Coast